Steni Vala (Greek: Στενή Βάλα) is the second most populous village on the Greek island of Alonnisos. Located on the east coast roughly 11km north of Patitiri. It has several tavernas and a campsite. There is a large beach just north of the village.

External links
Official website

Populated places in the Sporades